Comedy drama, also known by the portmanteau  dramedy,  is a genre of dramatic works that combines elements of comedy and drama. The modern, scripted-television examples tend to have more humorous bits than simple comic relief seen in a typical hour-long legal or medical drama, but exhibit far fewer jokes-per-minute as in a typical half-hour sitcom.

In the United States 
Examples from United States television include: M*A*S*H, Moonlighting, The Days and Nights of Molly Dodd, Northern Exposure, Ally McBeal, Sex and the City, Desperate Housewives and Scrubs. The term "dramedy" was coined to describe the late 1980s wave of shows, including The Wonder Years, Hooperman, Doogie Howser, M.D. and Frank's Place.

See also

List of comedy drama television series
Black comedy
Dramatic structure
Melodrama
Seriousness
Tragicomedy
Psychological drama

References

Comedy drama
Drama
Drama genres
Portmanteaus
Film genres
Television genres